The 2012 FAI Cup Final was the final match of the 2012 FAI Cup, the national association football cup of the Republic of Ireland. The match took place on 4 November 2012 at the Aviva Stadium in Dublin. Derry City and St Patrick's Athletic contested the final, in what was a re-match of the 2006 FAI Cup Final. On that occasion, Derry City won the trophy, winning 4–3 after extra time. Derry later competed in the 2008 FAI Cup Final, where they lost against Bohemians, while St Patrick's Athletic had not contested the final since the 2006 encounter. It has been 51 years since St Patrick's Athletic last won the FAI Cup. Neil Doyle was the referee, with Emmet Dynan and Robert Clark as assistants and Damien Hancock as the fourth official.
The cup was won by Derry City after extra time.
The match was shown live on RTÉ Two and RTÉ Two HD in Ireland.

Match

References

External links
 Derry City F.C. website 
 St Patrick's Athletic F.C. website

Final
FAI Cup finals
Fai Cup Final 2012
Fai Cup Final 2012
FAI Cup Final, 2012
FAI Cup Final